Rivolta d'Adda is a comune (municipality) in the Province of Cremona in the Italian region Lombardy, located about  east of Milan and about  northwest of Cremona.

Rivolta d'Adda borders the following municipalities: Agnadello, Arzago d'Adda, Casirate d'Adda, Cassano d'Adda, Comazzo, Merlino, Pandino, Spino d'Adda, Truccazzano. Sights include the church of San Sigismondo (11th century), the church of Santa Maria Immacolata (15th century), a Prehistoric Park with a museum  and reconstruction of extinct prehistoric creatures.

Interesting sites
Prehistoric Park, themed nature park located on the outskirts of the town itself, within the Adda Park.

References

Cities and towns in Lombardy